The 1873 Mongonui and Bay of Islands by-election was held on 24 July 1873 in the  electorate in Northland during the 5th New Zealand Parliament after the sitting member, John McLeod, resigned. The by-election was won by John William Williams.

John Macfarlane, one of the other candidates, denied that he had paid McLeod £200 to resign.

Results

References 

Mongonui, 1873
1873 elections in New Zealand
Politics of the Northland Region
July 1873 events
March 1875 events